Chęciny may refer to the following places:
Chęciny, Lubusz Voivodeship (west Poland)
Chęciny, Masovian Voivodeship (east-central Poland)
Chęciny in Świętokrzyskie Voivodeship (south-central Poland)